Joseph Abell (12 April 1891 – 1 February 1962) was a South African cricketer who played for Orange Free State in first-class cricket from 1921 to 1926.

References

External links

1891 births
British emigrants to South Africa
South African cricketers
1962 deaths
Free State cricketers